The women's 200 metres sprint event at the 1960 Olympic Games took place between September 3 and September 5.

Results

Heats

Held on September 3 from 3pm

The top two runners in each of the six heats (blue), plus the next two fastest (pink) advanced to the semifinal round.

Heat one

Heat two

Heat three

Heat four

Heat five

Heat six

Semifinals

Held on September 5 from 3:40pm

The fastest three runners in each of the two heats advanced to the final round.

Heat one

Heat two

Final

Held on September 5 at 5:10pm

Key: OR = Olympic record

Note: For the only time in Olympic sprint history, every finalist ran their fastest time for the event in the heats and their slowest time in the final, owing to rain, head winds and the schedule where the finalists had less than 90 minutes rest between the semi final and final, instead of the usual entire day.

References

Athletics at the 1960 Summer Olympics
200 metres at the Olympics
1960 in women's athletics
Women's events at the 1960 Summer Olympics